Phoxinus ketmaieri is a species of freshwater fish in the family Cyprinidae.

References

Phoxinus
Taxa named by Pier Giorgio Bianco
Taxa named by Salvatore De Bonis
Fish described in 2015